Myrmarachne is a genus of ant-mimicking jumping spiders that was first described by W. S. MacLeay in 1839. They are commonly called antmimicking spiders, but they are not the only spiders that have this attribute.

This genus has undergone many changes, and is still under review as more information becomes available. In 2016, several genera were split off, including Helicius and the monotypic genus Panachraesta. The genus Emertonius was revalidated in 2018 after being synonymized with Myrmarachne for nearly thirty years.

Description
Myrmarachne have an elongated cephalothorax with relatively long chelicerae that projects forward in males. The cephalothorax has a waist, and the opisthosoma often has one too. The colors can vary from black to yellow, depending on ant species it is mimicking, and can change over the course of its life. For example, one African species was observed to mimic a certain species of ants as a juvenile, and another ant species as an adult.
   
They tend to wave their front legs in the air to simulate antennae, and many have bodies that also closely resemble ants.

The genus Bocus is so similar to Myrmarachne that it cannot be distinguished without the help of a microscope.

Species
With about 80 described and many undescribed southeast Asian species, Myrmarachne is the most diverse genus of jumping spider in this region. A few species, such as the palearctic M. formicaria, occur in temperate regions.

 it contains 185 species and three subspecies found in the tropics from Africa to Australia, with some species found in the New World:

References

Further reading
 

Salticidae
Salticidae genera
Cosmopolitan spiders